Frogtown, Ohio may refer to:
Cassella, Ohio, also known as "Frogtown"
Pickrelltown, Ohio, also known as "Frogtown"
Toledo, Ohio, also known as "Frogtown"